Money is a personal finance management tool for Mac OS X by Jumsoft. The latest major release, version 3.0, was released in 2008. Money is designed for accounting and budgeting as well as for creating inventory lists and invoices, and is primarily marketed to small business and home users. The application is also used for investment management, as it offers a Portfolio feature displaying share information, security quote history, market indices, and the market value of a user’s share portfolio. Money does not support the traditional double-entry accounting and is based on separate cash, bank, investment, and other accounts.

Money is a part of Jumsoft’s Home Business Trio bundle of business management applications. Versions for iPhone and iPad are available for free at iTunes Store.

History
The first version of Money was released in 2003 and contained very basic tools for entering financial transactions and performing analysis. It was designed for Mac OS X 10.2 and 10.3, and was mainly intended for the U.S. market. In 2006, Money 2 Beta was launched, featuring a substantially expanded range of functions. The new version introduced budgeting, visual reports, scheduled transactions and transfers among accounts, as well as multiple currencies. Less than a month after the beta version appeared, Jumsoft released a stable version 2.0. Version 3.0 was launched in 2008 and added budget and investment portfolio monitoring, inventories, and invoices to the list of features.

Language availability

Money is available in the following languages: English, French, German, Italian.

References

External links
Money Official Website
Jumsoft Official Website

Accounting software
Business software
Financial software
MacOS-only software
Personal information manager software for macOS